Drop-in replacement is a term used in computer science and other fields. It refers to the ability
to replace one hardware (or software) component with another one without any other code or configuration
changes being required and resulting in no negative impacts. Usually, the replacement has some benefits including one or more of the following:
 increased security
 increased speed
 increased feature set
 increased compatibility (e.g. with other components or standards support)
 increased support (e.g. the old component may no longer be supported, maintained, or manufactured)

See also
 Pin compatibility
 Plug compatible
 Clone (computing)
 Backward compatibility
 Kludge

Software architecture